This is a list of the butterflies of China belonging to the family Papilionidae and an index to the species articles. This forms part of the full list of butterflies of China. 371 species or subspecies of Papilionidae are recorded from China.

Papilionidae
genus: Atrophaneura
Atrophaneura latreillei (Donovan, 1826)
A. l. genestieri (Oberthür, 1918) Yunnan
Atrophaneura polyeuctes (Doubleday, 1842)
A. p. lama (Oberthür, 1876) West China
Atrophaneura dasarada (Moore, 1857)
A. d. ouvrardi Oberthür, 1920 Tibet, Yunnan
A. d. melanura (Rothschild, 1905) Hainan
Atrophaneura nevilli (Wood-Mason, 1882) West China
Atrophaneura alcinous (Klug, 1836)
A. a. mansonensis (Fruhstorfer, 1901) South China
Atrophaneura daemonius (Alphéraky, 1895) West China, Tibet
A. d. yunnana (Oberthür, 1907) Yunnan
Atrophaneura plutonius (Oberthür, 1876) West China
Atrophaneura mencius (C. & R. Felder, 1862) Central China, Southeast China
Atrophaneura rhadinus (Jordan, 1928) Yunnan
Atrophaneura zaleucus (Hewitson, 1865) Yunnan
Atrophaneura aidoneus (Doubleday, 1845) Yunnan
Atrophaneura coon (Fabricius, 1793)
A. c. insperatus (Joicey & Talbot, 1921) Hainan
genus: Bhutanitis
Bhutanitis lidderdalii Atkinson, 1873
B. l. spinosa Bauer & Frankenbach, 1998 Northwest Yunnan, Southwest China
Bhutanitis thaidina (Blanchard, 1871)
B. t. thaidina (Blanchard, 1871) China, Tibet
B. t. dongchuanensis Lee
Bhutanitis yulongensis Chou
Bhutanitis nigrilima Chou
Bhutanitis mansfieldi (Riley, 1939)
B. m. pulchristriata Saigusa & Lee, 1982 Szechwan
genus: Graphium
Graphium cloanthus (Westwood, 1841)
G. c. clymenus (Leech, 1893) South China West China
Graphium sarpedon (Linnaeus, 1758)
G. s. sarpedon (Linnaeus, 1758) China, Hainan, Yunnan
Graphium eurypylus (Linnaeus, 1758)
G. e. cheronus (Jordan, 1909) South China, Yunnan, Hainan
Graphium chironides (Honrath, 1884)
G. c. chironides (Honrath, 1884) Yunnan
Graphium doson (C. & R. Felder, 1864)
G. d. axion (C. & R. Felder, 1864) China, Hainan
Graphium bathycles (Zinken, 1831)
Graphium leechi (Rothschild, 1895)
Graphium agamemnon (Linnaeus, 1758)
G. a. agamemnon (Linnaeus, 1758) Yunnan
Graphium antiphates (Cramer, [1775])
G. a. antiphates (Cramer, [1775]) Southeast China
G. a. pompilius (Fabricius, 1787) Hainan, Yunnan
Graphium nomius (Esper, 1799)
G. n. hainana (Chou, 1994) Hainan
Graphium agetes (Westwood, 1843)
G. a. chinensis (Chou & Li, 1994) Yunnan
Graphium xenocles (Doubleday, 1842)
G. x. xenoclides (Fruhstorfer, 1902) Hainan
Graphium eurous (Leech, [1893])
G. e. panopaea (de Nicéville, 1900) West China
Graphium mandarinus (Oberthür, 1879)
Graphium alebion (Gray, [1853])
Graphium tamerlana (Oberthür, 1876)
G. t. taliensis (O. Bang-Haas, 1927)
Graphium hoenei (Mell, 1935) Guangdong, Fujian, Zhejiang, Shaanxi, Sichuan
Graphium glycerion (Gray, 1831)
genus: Luehdorfia
Luehdorfia chinensis Leech, 1893
Luehdorfia japonica Leech, 1889
Luehdorfia puziloi (Erschoff, 1872)
L. p. lenzeni Bryk, 1938 China
L. p. lingjangensis Lee, 1982 China
genus: Papilio
Papilio machaon Linnaeus, 1758
P. m. sikkimensis Moore, 1884 Tibet
P. m. centralis Staudinger, 1886 Tian-Shan
P. m. montanus Alphéraky, 1897 Sichuan, Gansu, Qinghai, Yunnan
P. m. verityi Fruhstorfer, 1907 Yunnan
P. m. orientis Verity, 1911 Amur
P. m. oreinus Sheljuzhko, 1919 Tian-Shan
P. m. taliensis Eller, 1939 Yunnan
P. m. kiyonobu Morita, 1997 Tibet
P. m. baijianensis Huang & Murayama, 1992 Tian-Shan
Papilio alexanor Esper, 1800
P. a. voldemar Kreuzberg, 1989 Tian-Shan
Papilio xuthus Linnaeus, 1767 Yunnan
Papilio polytes Linnaeus, 1758
P. p. polytes China
P. p. mandane Rothschild, 1895 West China
P. p. liujidongi Huang, 2003 Yunnan
Papilio castor Westwood, 1842
P. c. hamela Crowley, 1900 Hainan
Papilio mahadeva Moore, [1879]
P. m. choui Li, 1994 Guangxi
Papilio helenus Linnaeus, 1758
P. h. helenus Linnaeus, 1758 China
Papilio nephelus Boisduval, 1836
P. n. chaon Westwood, 1845 Yunnan
P. n. chaonulus Fruhstorfer, 1902 South China, Hainan
Papilio memnon Linnaeus, 1758
P. m. agenor Linnaeus, 1768 Yunnan
Papilio protenor Cramer, [1775]
P. p. euprotenor Fruhstorfer, 1908 South China
Papilio alcmenor C. & R. Felder, [1864]
P. a. irene Joicey & Talbot, 1921 Hainan
Papilio macilentus Janson, 1877 East China
Papilio bootes Westwood, 1842
P. b. nigricans Rothschild, 1895 West China
P. b. dealbatus Rothschild, 1895 West China
P. b. parcesquamata Rosen, 1929 Yunnan
Papilio elwesi Leech, 1889
Papilio agestor Gray, 1831
P. a. restricta Leech, 1893 South China
P. a. kuangtungensis Mell, 1935 Guangxi, Guandong, Fujian, Zhejiang
Papilio epycides Hewitson, 1864
P. e. horatius Blanchard, 1871 Sichuan
P. e. hypochra Jordan, 1909 South Yunnan
P. e. yamabuki (Yoshino, 2008) North Yunnan
Papilio slateri Hewitson, 1859
P. s. hainanensis (Chou, 1994) Hainan
Papilio clytia Linnaeus, 1758
P. c. panope Linnaeus, 1758 Hainan
Papilio paradoxa (Zinken, 1831)
P. p. telearchus (Hewitson, 1852) Yunnan
Papilio paris Linnaeus, 1758
P. p. paris Linnaeus, 1758 Southwest China
Papilio bianor Cramer, 1777
P. b. bianor Cramer, 1777 South China
P. b. ganesa Doubleday, 1842 Yunnan
Papilio maackii Menetries, 1859
P. m. han (Yoshino, 1997) Fujian, Zhejiang, Sichuan
Papilio dialis Leech, 1893 West China
Papilio krishna Moore, 1857
P. k. charlesi Fruhstorfer, 1902 West China
Papilio arcturus Westwood, 1842 West China
P. a. arcturulus Fruhstorfer, 1902 Szechuan
Papilio polyctor Boisduval, 1836
P. p. xiei Chou, 1994 Yunnan
Papilio syfanius Oberthür, 1886
P. s. syfanius North Yunnan
P. s. albosyfanius Shimogori & Fujioka, 1997 North Yunnan
P. s. kongaensis (Yoshino, 1997) Sichuan
genus: Parnassius
For a fuller list of subspecies in this genus see
Parnassius apollo (Linnaeus, 1758)
P. a. merzbacheri Fruhstorfer, 1906 Tian-Shan
Parnassius nomion Fischer de Waldheim, 1823
P. n. liupinschani Bang-Haas, 1934 Shensi
P. n. epaphoides Bryk & Eisner, 1937 Kansu
P. n. badius Bang-Haas, 1938 Kansu
Parnassius phoebus (Fabricius, 1793)
P. p. halasicus Huang & Murayama, 1992
Parnassius actius (Eversmann, 1843)
P. a. minutus Verity, 1911 Tian-Shan
P. a. ambrosius Stichel, 1907 Tian-Shan
P. a. dubitabilis Verity, 1911 Tian-Shan
P. a. actinoboloides Bang-Haas, 1928 Kansu
Parnassius jacquemonti Boisduval, 1836
P. j. variabilis Stichel, 1906 Tian-Shan
P. j. tibetanus Ruhl, 1892 Tibet
Parnassius tianschianicus Oberthür, 1879
P. t. chimganus Kreuzberg, 1989 Tian-Shan
P. t. astrictio Ohya, 1987 Tian-Shan
P. t. thiseus Ehrmann, 1920 Tian-Shan
Parnassius epaphus Oberthür, 1879
P. e. poeta Oberthür, 1892
P. e. nanchaninca Austaut, 1899 Nanchan
P. e. phariensis Avinoff, 1916 Tibet
P. e. dongalaica Tytler, 1926 Tibet
P. e. subtilis Bang-Haas, 1927
Parnassius bremeri Bremer, 1864 Heilunkiang, Shansi, Hopei
Parnassius apollonius (Eversmann, 1847)
P. a. gloriosus Fruhstorfer, 1904 Tian-Shan
P. a. narynus Fruhstorfer, 1908 Tian-Shan
P. a. poseidon Bryk & Eisner, 1934 Tian-Shan
Parnassius mnemosyne (Linnaeus, 1758) Tian-Shan
Parnassius stubbendorfi Ménétriés, 1849
P. s. bodemeyeri Bryk, 1914 Amur
P. s. bronkampi Bang-Haas, 1933 Kansu
Parnassius glacialis Butler, 1866
P. g. nankingi Bang-Haas, 1927 Nanking
P. g. sinicus Bryk, 1932 Chang-Jong
P. g. tajanus Bryk, 1932
P. g. anachoreta Bryk, 1936
Parnassius felderi Bremer, 1861
Parnassius ariadne (Lederer, 1853)
P. a. jiadengyuensis Huang & Murayama, 1992 Xinjiang (Altai)
Parnassius orleans Oberthür, 1890
P. o. johanna Bryk, 1932 Shensi
P. o. parthenos Bryk, 1932 Szechwan
P. o. lobnorica Bryk, 1934 Lob Nor
P. o. janseni Bang-Haas, 1938 Minshan
P. o. schneideri Bang-Haas, 1938 Kansu
P. o. lakshmi Mikami, 1998
Parnassius acco Gray, [1853]
P. a. tagalangi Bang-Haas, 1927 Tibet
P. a. liliput (Bryk, 1932) Tibet
P. a. gyanglaputsai Huang, 1998 Tibet
Parnassius hannyngtoni Avinoff, 1916 South Tibet
Parnassius przewalskii Alphéraky, 1887
Parnassius baileyi South, 1913
P. p. liae Huang & Murayama, 1989 West China
P. b. baileyanus (Bryk, 1932) West China
P. b. rothschildianus Bryk, 1931 Szechwan
Parnassius labeyriei Weiss & Michel Qinghai
Parnassius schultei Weiss & Michel, 1989 Tibet
Parnassius szechenyii Frivaldszky, 1886
P. s. germanae Austaut, 1906 Ta-tsien-lou
P. s. lethe Bryk & Eisner
P. s. frivaldszkyi Bang-Haas, 1928 Kansu
P. s. kansuensis Bryk & Eisner, 1931 Kansu
P. s. arnoldiana (Bang-Haas, 1938) Minshan
P. s. luminosa (Bang-Haas, 1938) Qilian Shan
Parnassius cephalus Grum-Grshimailo, 1891
P. c. elwesi Leech, 1893 Tibet
P. c. rileyanus (Bryk, 1932) Tibet
P. c. irene Bryk & Eisner Qinghai
P. c. eierhoffi (Bang-Haas, 1938)Kansu
P. c. sengei (Bang-Haas, 1938) Minshan
P. c. paimaensis Yoshino, 1997 Yunnan
Parnassius choui Huang & Shi, 1994
Parnassius delphius Eversmann, 1843
Parnassius hide Koiwaya, 1987
Parnassius acdestis Grum-Grshimailo, 1891
P. a. hades (Bryk, 1932) Tibet
P. a. lathonius Bryk Tibet
P. a. lux (Eisner, 1969) Tibet
P. a. yanae Huang, 1998 Xiagangjiang Mountains
Parnassius tenedius Eversmann, 1851
Parnassius simo Gray, [1853]
P. s. hingstoni (Bryk, 1932) Tibet
P. s. bainqenerdini Huang, 1998 Xiagangjiang Mountains
Parnassius andreji Eisner, 1930
P. a. eos Bryk & Eisner, 1934 Kansu
P. a. buddenbrocki (Bang-Haas, 1938) Minshan
P. a. dirschi Bang-Haas, 1938 Kansu
Parnassius charltonius Gray, [1853]
P. c. basharianus (Eisner, 1969) Tibet
Parnassius loxias Püngeler, 1901
Parnassius imperator Oberthür, 1883
P. i. augustus Fruhstorfer, 1903 Nan Shan
P. i. intermedius Rothschild, 1909 Tibet
P. i. irmae (Bryk, 1932) Tibet
P. i. aino (Bryk, 1932) Yunnan
P. i. evansi (Bryk, 1932) Tibet
P. i. regulus Bryk & Eisner, 1932 Nan Shan
P. i. regina Bryk & Eisner, 1932 Minshan
P. i. dominus Bang-Haas, 1934 Qinghai
P. i. uxoria Bang-Haas, 1935 Qinghai
genus: Sericinus
Sericinus montela Gray, 1852
genus: Teinopalpus
Teinopalpus aureus Mell, 1923
T. a. wuyiensis Lee, 1992
T. a. guangxiensis Chou & Zhou, 1994 Guangxi, Mt. Dayaoshan
T. a. hainanensis Lee Hainan
Teinopalpus imperialis Hope, 1843
T. i. imperialis Hope, 1843
T. i. behludinii Pen, 1936 Sichuan

References

Bauer, Erich and Thomas Frankenbach (1998). Schmetterlinge der Erde, Butterflies of the world Part I (1), Papilionidae Papilionidae I: Papilio, Subgenus Achillides, Bhutanitis, Teinopalpus. Edited by Erich Bauer and Thomas Frankenbach.  Keltern: Goecke & Evers; Canterbury: Hillside Books 

Chou, I0 (ed) 1994. Monographia Rhopalocerorum Sinensium (Monograph of Chinese Butterflies). Henan Scientific and Technological Publishing House, Zhengzhou. (in Chinese). . Lists species plus new distribution records for China. New species descriptions are noted in English. Colour photographs of the species treated, with accompanying Chinese text.
Full list references.

External links
 Catalogue of life China List provided by Chinese Academy of Sciencesonline here
 Butterflies of China at Digital moths of Japan. Includes images.
 Wikispecies taxonomy additional references via species or genus
 Acta Zootaxonomica Sinica

Lists of butterflies of China